Annabelle (born 26 July 1967) is a French singer, actress, and daughter of actor Marcel Mouloudji.

Singer
She performed the title "Fuis Lawrence d'Arabia" in 1987, which peaked at No. 12 on the French Singles Chart (Top 50). In 1988, two other 12" were released : "Casanova Solo" and "Impunément", which didn't meet the same success despite a music video for "Impunément" which was a real mini movie about ten minutes.

In 2002 Bruno Blum released a reggae version of The Clash's Should I Stay or Should I Go on a Jamaican 45 RPM vinyl single featuring Annabelle Mouloudji improvising a scat vocal. The song was reissued on CD in 2011 as part of the Human Race anthology. Other contributions with Bruno Blum include co-writing La Bombe glacée (featured on Blum's Think Différent album) and other songs recorded and released by him. A French version of Should I Stay or Should I Go also featuring Annabelle, entitled Si je reste, was released as a CD single in France. It was also included on Bruno Blum'''s Nuage d'Éthiopie 2001 album.

Annabelle made a brief come back in the music in 2000 with the album of children's rhymes La Vie à découvrir de Victor et Amandine, which was very different from her 1980s songs.

Actress
She was also an actress in movies : Un Été d'enfer (1984), À nous les garçons (1985) and has participated in several TV movies as Theroigne de Méricourt (1989), Trois Nuits (1991) or La Crim ( 1999).

Author
In 2011, she released an autobiographical book titled La P'tite Coquelicot'', published by Calmann-Lévy.

References

1967 births
Living people
French film actresses
French people of Breton descent
French people of Algerian descent
French television actresses
Annabelle